Imperium: Saint Peter is a 2005 Italian television-film about the life and work of Saint Peter.  The film stars Omar Sharif as Peter, and was originally released as San Pietro.

Cast
Omar Sharif as Saint Peter
Johannes Brandrup as Jesus
Daniele Pecci as Paul the Apostle
Lina Sastri as Mary
Philippe Leroy as Gamaliel
Milena Miconi as Mary Magdalene
Fabrizio Bucci  as John
Manrico Gammarota  as Andrew
Marco Vivio as Stephen
Marco Leonardi as Mark
Bianca Guaccero as Silvia

Costumes by:Stefano De Nardis

See also
List of historical drama films

External links

2000s biographical films
2000s historical films
2005 films
Biographical films about religious leaders
Films set in ancient Rome
Films set in Italy
Films set in the 1st century
Films set in the Roman Empire
Italian biographical films
Italian historical films
Films directed by Giulio Base
Portrayals of Jesus on television
Portrayals of Jesus in film
Cultural depictions of Saint Peter
Portrayals of Mary Magdalene in film
Portrayals of the Virgin Mary in film
2000s Italian films